Brown Local Schools is a school district located in Carroll County, Ohio, United States.  The only high school for the district is located in Malvern, Ohio and is called Malvern High School.

See also
List of school districts in Ohio

References

External links
 

Education in Carroll County, Ohio
School districts in Ohio